Bernardino Orsini (died 1511) was a Roman Catholic prelate who served as Bishop of Nocera de' Pagani (1503–1511).

Biography
On 7 May 1503, Bernardino Orsini was appointed during the papacy of Pope Alexander VI as Bishop of Nocera de' Pagani.
He served as Bishop of Nocera de' Pagani until his death in 1511.

References

External links and additional sources
 (for Chronology of Bishops) 
 (for Chronology of Bishops) 

16th-century Italian Roman Catholic bishops
Bishops appointed by Pope Alexander VI
1511 deaths